Astakhov is a rural locality (a khutor) in Chernorechenskoye Rural Settlement, Kikvidzensky District, Volgograd Oblast, Russia. The population was 37 as of 2010.

Geography 
Astakhov is located on Khopyorsko-Buzulukskaya plain, on the left bank of the Chyornaya River, 40 km southeast of Preobrazhenskaya (the district's administrative centre) by road. Besov is the nearest rural locality.

References 

Rural localities in Kikvidzensky District